120 Collins Street is a  skyscraper in Collins Street, Melbourne central business district, Victoria, Australia. It was built from 1989 to 1991 and it comprises 50 levels of office accommodation and four levels of plant.

The building was designed by architectural firm Hassell, in association with Daryl Jackson. Structural engineers were Connell Wagner, and mechanical, electrical and fire services engineers were Lincolne Scott.

120 Collins Street is a postmodern style building, paying homage to New York City's grand Art Deco buildings, such as the Empire State Building and the Chrysler Building. This influence can be seen in the building's granite façade, its setbacks and its central mast.

The building is home to a number of high-profile tenants including Bank of America Merrill Lynch, Bain, BlackRock, Rothschild, Knight Frank, Qualitas, Standard & Poor's, BlueScope, Urbis, Mitsubishi, Rio Tinto Group, Ord Minnet, System Partners, Morgan Stanley,  Citigroup and Korn Ferry.

It was the tallest building in Australia for 14 years until it was surpassed by the Q1 in 2005. It remained the tallest building in Melbourne until being surpassed by the residential Eureka Tower in 2006. As of 2022, it is the fifth-tallest building in Melbourne and the eighth-tallest building in Australia.

See also 

 Architecture of Melbourne
 List of tallest buildings in Melbourne
 List of tallest buildings in Australia

References

External links 

 Building official website
 Emporis.com
 Melbourne's tallest building timeline 

Skyscrapers in Melbourne
Office buildings in Melbourne
1991 establishments in Australia
Skyscraper office buildings in Australia
Office buildings completed in 1991
Collins Street, Melbourne
Buildings and structures in Melbourne City Centre